This is a list of State Protected Monuments as officially reported by and available through the website of the Archaeological Survey of India in the Indian state Kerala. The monument identifier is a combination of the abbreviation of the subdivision of the list (state, ASI circle) and the numbering as published on the website of the ASI. 116 Kerala State Protected Monuments have been recognized by the Kerala State Department of Archaeology under Kerala Ancient Monuments and Archaeological sites and Remains Act of 1968.

List of state protected monuments 

|}

See also 
 List of State Protected Monuments in India, for other State Protected Monuments in India
 List of Monuments of National Importance in Kerala

References

External links
Kerala Archaeology Department
Protected Monuments

Kerala
state protected monuments